The International Congress on Industrial and Applied Mathematics (ICIAM) is an international congress in the field of applied mathematics held every four years under the auspices of the International Council for Industrial and Applied Mathematics. The initial proposal for this conference series was made by Gene Golub.

List of congresses
 ICIAM 1987 –  Paris
 ICIAM 1991 – Washington, D.C.
 ICIAM 1995 – Hamburg 
 ICIAM 1999 – Edinburgh  
 ICIAM 2003 – Sydney 
 ICIAM 2007 – Zurich 
 ICIAM 2011 – Vancouver 
 ICIAM 2015 – Beijing 
 ICIAM 2019 – Valencia 
 ICIAM 2023 – Tokyo

See also
 Society for Industrial and Applied Mathematics
 International Congress of Mathematics

References

Recurring events established in 1987
Mathematics conferences
Quadrennial events